Emerich Jenei or Imre Jenei (also known as Emeric Jenei or Ienei; 22 March 1937) is a Romanian former football player and coach of Hungarian ethnicity. He is considered one of Romania's best Managers, alongside Ştefan Kovács, Mircea Lucescu, and Anghel Iordănescu.

On 25 March 2008, he was decorated by the president of Romania, Traian Băsescu with Ordinul "Meritul Sportiv" – (The Order "The Sportive Merit") class II with one barret for his part in winning the 1986 European Cup Final.

He is the 2nd most successful Manager in Romania, tied with Dan Petrescu, winning the Romanian First League on 6 occasions, all with Steaua București. First is ranked Nicolae Dumitru, who has won 7 championships, all with Dinamo București .

Biography
Jenei was born in Agrișu Mic, Arad County, to ethnic Hungarian parents. As a child, he moved with his family to Losonc (now Lučenec, Slovakia), because his father did not want to serve in the Romanian army. Later his father became a Hungarian soldier, but following the end of the war he did not come back and Jenei with his mother moved back to Arad. Two years after they resettled in their old home, Jenei's father, who was held in captivity, unexpectedly returned. Not much later Jenei's mother died when he was only 12 years old.

Before his professional football career, Jenei wanted to become a lawyer. He made his debut playing for Flamura Roșie Arad – now UT Arad, in the Romanian Liga I. In 1957, at age 20, he signed with Steaua club in Bucharest (1957). He played for Steaua until 1969, when he left Romania to play in Turkey for Kayserispor. He had reached the age of 32, when Romania's Communist authorities would allow few players to move abroad. In 1971, Jenei retired as player and became a coach. During his career as a footballer, he won 6 caps for Romania's national team (between 1959 and 1963).

The highlights of his career as a player were the Romanian football championship titles he won with Steaua in 1959–60, 1960–61 and 1967–68, as well as his participation with Romania's Olympic team at the 1964 Summer Olympics in Japan, where the Romanians came on 5th place.

As a coach, Jenei continued to enjoy success. Having returned from Turkey, he was named assistant coach at Steaua at the beginning of the 1972–73 season. One year later, he was promoted to a head coaching position and finished 5th in Liga I, winning his first championship title as coach in 1976, then finishing as a runner-up in 1977. He won another championship title in 1978, but at the end of the season he was replaced by Gheorghe Constantin.

In 1978–79, Jenei coached FC Bihor of Oradea, but the team finished the season in last place and he was sacked as a result. In 1981, he took over at CS Târgovişte, and the beginning of the 1982–83 season found him as coach of Steaua for a second stint. After two years, in which failed to win the championship, he was again sacked, only to be brought back after four months.

In 1985, he won a new championship and in the following season led Steaua București to victory in the European Cup final against FC Barcelona in May 1986. In the summer of 1986, Jenei was named co-head coach of the Romania national football team, together with Mircea Lucescu, making his debut against Norway. Lucescu was sacked after a short while and Jenei became the only national team coach. He failed to qualify the team for the UEFA Euro 1988, but took the team to World Cup 1990. It was the first qualification of Romania at a World Cup in twenty years. Between August 1986 and June 1990, Jenei coached the team in 40 games, including two wins against Spain in 1987 and Italy in 1989.

After the World Cup, He returned to Steaua București in April 1991, for the fourth time, only to be sacked again in December of same year. He was named head coach of Hungary between 1992 and 1993, but failed to produce notable results, instead he won the Kirin Cup in 1993, an international tournament organized by Japan, and later being replaced by Ferenc Puskás.

Jenei did not return to the pitch for a while, but, in August 1993, Emerich Jenei began his fifth stint as coach of Steaua, and won the championship one year later. In 1996, he was named head coach of Universitatea Craiova but was sacked after only ten games. Two years later he returned to Steaua for his sixth and final stint there.

In 2000, Jenei he was again called to coach Romania. The squad qualified for Euro 2000 but the previous coach – Victor Piţurcă – was sacked after a scandal which involved the team's best players, including Gheorghe Popescu and Gheorghe Hagi. At Euro 2000, Jenei took the team to the last eight, one of the team's best performances. During his second stint, the national team played 11 games.

In June 2000, he decided to retire from coaching. After that date, Jenei was president of FC Bihor and also worked for the Romanian Football Federation. He is regularly consulted by the Romanian media for his opinion ahead of important football games for Romanian clubs, especially Steaua, or the Romania national team.

Until her death in 2021, Jenei was married to Ileana, former fencer for Romania, world champion and Olympic medalist. They have a daughter named Cristina. Jenei also has a son named Călin with his first wife, actress Vasilica Tastaman.

Honours

Player
Steaua Bucharest
Romanian League (3): 1959–60, 1960–61 1967–68
Romanian Cup (4): 1961–62, 1965–66, 1966–67, 1968–69

Romania U19
UEFA Junior Tournament (1): 1956

Romania Olympic team
Olympic Games Japan Fifth-place (1): 1964

Manager
Steaua Bucharest
Liga I (6): 1975–76, 1977–78, 1984–85, 1985–86, 1986–87, 1993–94
Cupa României (3): 1975–76, 1984–85, 1998–99
European Cup (1): 1985–86

Romania
European Football Championship Quarter-finalist (1): 2000

Notes

References

External links
 Profile  at SteauaFC.com 
 
 
 Managerial stats at labtof.ro
 Profile at kayserispor.org

1937 births
Living people
1990 FIFA World Cup managers
Association football midfielders
FC Bihor Oradea managers
FC Steaua București managers
FC Steaua București players
FC U Craiova 1948 managers
FC UTA Arad players
FCM Târgoviște managers
Fehérvár FC managers
Footballers at the 1964 Summer Olympics
Hungary national football team managers
Kayserispor footballers
Liga I players
Olympic footballers of Romania
Panionios F.C. managers
People from Arad County
Romania national football team managers
Romanian footballers
Romania international footballers
Romanian expatriate footballers
Romanian football managers
Romanian sportspeople of Hungarian descent
UEFA Champions League winning managers
UEFA Euro 2000 managers